Anacanthaspis is a genus of flies in the family Xylophagidae.

Species
Anacanthaspis bifasciata Röder, 1889
Anacanthaspis japonica Shiraki, 1932

References

Xylophagidae
Brachycera genera
Diptera of Asia